Ramone can refer to:

 Ramones, American punk rock group, or any of its members
 C. J. Ramone, bassist
 Dee Dee Ramone (1951–2002), bassist
 Elvis Ramone, stage name of Clem Burke, drummer
 Joey Ramone (1951–2001), vocalist and songwriter
 Johnny Ramone (1948–2004), guitarist
 Marky Ramone, drummer
 Richie Ramone, drummer
 Tommy Ramone, (1949–2014) producer and drummer
 Michael Ramone (born 1961), American politician from Delaware
 Phil Ramone (1941–2013), music producer and composer
 Ramone (Cars), character from the film Cars

Given name
Ramone Hamilton (born 2006), American actor
Ramone McKenzie (born 1990), Jamaican sprinter 
Ramone Moore (born 1989),  American basketball player for

See also
Ramón (disambiguation)